The following is a list of Seventh-day Adventist schools, colleges & universities in the Philippines.

Universities and colleges 
Adventist International Institute of Advanced Studies - Silang, Cavite
Adventist Medical Center College - Iligan City, Lanao del Norte
Adventist University of the Philippines - Silang, Cavite
Central Philippine Adventist College - Murcia, Negros Occidental
Manila Adventist College - Pasay
Mountain View College - Valencia City
Naga View Adventist College - Panicuason, Naga City
Northeast Luzon Adventist College - Alicia, Isabela
Northern Luzon Adventist College - Sison, Pangasinan
South Philippine Adventist College - Matanao, Davao del Sur

Secondary schools
Aim Scholastic Informative academy- Novaliches Quezon City
Adventist Academy Cebu - Talisay City, Cebu
Adventist International Institute of Advanced Studies Junior Academy - Silang, Cavite
Adventist Mission Academy of Romblon - Odiongan, Romblon
Adventist University of the Philippines Academy - Silang, Cavite
Baesa Adventist Academy - Caloocan
Baguio Adventist Academy - Baguio
Banahaw View Adventist Academy - Lucban, Quezon
Caldwell Adventist Academy - Zamboanga City
Calinan Lam Adventist Academy - Davao City
Central Luzon Adventist Academy - Floridablanca, Pampanga
Concepcion Adventist Academy - Concepcion, Ilocos Sur
Digos Central Adventist Academy - Digos, Davao del Sur
East Visayan Academy - Talisay, Cebu
East Visayan Adventist Academy - Javier, Leyte
Esperanza District Adventist Academy - Esperanza, Sultan Kudarat
Faith Adventist Academy - Taytay, Palawan
Immanuel Adventist Academy - Lopez Jaena, Misamis Occidental
Lake View Academy - Don Carlos, Bukidnon
Lipa Adventist Academy - Lipa, Batangas
Manila Center Church Academy - Quezon City
Matutum View Academy - Tupi, South Cotabato
Mindanao Mission Academy - Manticao, Misamis Oriental
Mountain View College Academy - Valencia, Bukidnon
Naga View Adventist College Academy - Naga, Cebu
Negros Mission Academy - Bacolod
Northeast Luzon Adventist College Academy - Alicia, Isabela
Northeast Mindanao Academy - Butuan
Northern Luzon Adventist College Academy - Sison, Pangasinan
Palawan Adventist Academy - Narra, Palawan
Pasay City Adventist Academy - Pasay
San Jose Adventist Academy - San Jose, Occidental Mindoro
Southern Negros Adventist Academy - Kabankalan, Negros Occidental
South Philippine Adventist College Academy - Matanao, Davao del Sur
Tirad View Academy - Quirino, Ilocos Sur
West Visayan Academy - Iloilo City
Western Mindanao Adventist Academy - Dumingag, Zamboanga del Sur

Elementary schools
Abongan Adventist Elementary School - Taytay, Palawan
Angeles Adventist Elementary School - Angeles, Pampanga
Bad-As Adventist Learning Center - Placer, Surigao del Norte
Baesa Adventist Elementary School - Caloocan
Bacarrena Adventist Elementary School - San Mateo, Isabela
Bacolod Adventist Elementary School - Bacolod
Baganian Peninsula Learning Center - Dinas, Zamboanga del Sur
Bagontaas Adventist Elementary School - Bagontaas, Bukidnon
Balayan Adventist Elementary School - Balayan, Batangas
Banga SDA Elementary School - Banga, South Cotabato
Barobo Adventist Learning Center - Barobo, Surigao del Sur
Bayabason SDA Elementary School - Maramag, Bukidnon
Baybay Adventist Elementary School - Baybay, Leyte
Bayugan Adventist Learning Center - Bayugan, Agusan del Sur
Biñan Adventist Elementary School - Biñan, Laguna
Bocaue Adventist Elementary School - Bocaue, Bulacan
Bocboc Adventist Elementary School - Bocboc, Don Carlos, Bukidnon
Bongao Adventist Elementary School - Bongao, Tawi-Tawi
Buenavista SDA Elementary School - Buenavista, Iloilo
Cabanatuan Adventist Elementary School - Cabanatuan
Cabiao Adventist Elementary School - Cabiao, Nueva Ecija
Cagayan de Oro City Adventist Elementary School - Cagayan de Oro
Calamba Adventist Elementary School - Calamba, Laguna
Caldwell Adventist Elementary School - Zamboanga City
Caloocan Adventist Elementary School - Caloocan
Carino Adventist School Inc. - Paniqui, Tarlac
Casiguran Adventist Elementary School - Quezon City
Catanauan Adventist School - Catanauan, Quezon
Calumpang Central SDA Elementary School - General Santos
Clarin Adventist Elementary School - Clarin, Misamis Occidental
Commonwealth Adventist Elementary School - Quezon City
Dagatan Adventist Elementary School - Taysan, Batangas
Daet Adventist Elementary School - Daet, Camarines Sur
Digos Central SDA Elementary School - Digos, Davao del Sur
Dinalupihan Adventist Elementary School - Dinalupihan, Bataan
Diplahan Adventist Elementary School - Diplahan, Zamboanga Sibugay
Dipolog Adventist Elementary School - Dipolog
Dumangas SDA Elementary School - Dumangas, Iloilo
Estancia SDA Elementary School - Estancia, Iloilo
F.G. Cabardo Memorial Elementary School - Mahayag, Zamboanga del Sur
Gapan Adventist Elementary School - Gapan 
Gingoog City Adventist Elementary School - Gingoog
Golden Boulevard Adventist Elementary School - Cagayan de Oro
Hillside View Adventist Elementary School - Bansud, Mindoro Oriental
Hilltop Adventist Elementary School - Valencia, Bukidnon
Hinigaran Adventist Elementary School - Hinigaran, Negros Occidental
Iligan City Adventist Elementary School - Iligan City
Iloilo SDA Elementary School - Iloilo City
Imelda Adventist Elementary School - Caloocan
Ipil SDA Elementary School - Ipil, Zamboanga Sibugay
Iriga Adventist Elementary School - Iriga City
Kadingilan Adventist Elementary School - Kadingilan, Bukidnon
Kapatagan Valley SDA Elementary School - Kapatagan, Lanao del Norte
Kitanglad View Adventist Elementary School - Malaybalay, Bukidnon
Labason Adventist Elementary School - Labason, Zamboanga del Norte
Ligao Adventist Elementary School - Ligao City
Logac Adventist Multigrade School - Lallo, Cagayan
Ligaya Adventist Elementary School - Sablayan, Occidental Mindoro
Los Baños Adventist Elementary School - Los Baños, Laguna
Lower Lilingayon Adventist Elementary School- Lower Lilingayon, Valencia City
Lucena Adventist Elementary School - Lucena, Quezon
Luisiana Adventist Elementary School - Luisiana, Laguna
Lurugan Adventist Elementary School - Valencia, Bukidnon
Mabini Adventist Learning Center - Tagum City
Mailag Adventist Elementary School - Mailag, Valencia City
Magallanes Adventist Elementary School - Magallanes, Cavite
Malangas SDA Elementary School - Malangas, Zamboanga Sibugay
Malaya Adventist Elementary School - Bansud, Oriental Mindoro
Malaybalay City Adventist Elementary School - Malaybalay City
Malolos Adventist Elementary School - Malolos, Bulacan
Manila Center Adventist Elementary School - Quezon City
Manila Central Adventist Elementary School - Santa Cruz, Manila
Metro Batangas Adventist Elementary School - Batangas City
Meycauayan Adventist Elementary School - Meycauayan, Bulacan
Molave Adventist Elementary School - Molave, Zamboanga del Sur
Nagcarlan Adventist Elementary School - Nagcarlan, Laguna
Naguilian Adventist Multigrade School - Naguilian, Isabela
Navotas Adventist Elementary School - Longos, Navotas
Norberto Bana Sr. Memorial SDA Elementary School - Pagadian City
Norzagaray Adventist Elementary School - Norzagaray, Bulacan
Odiongan SDA Elementary School - Odiongan, Romblon
Olongapo City Adventist Elementary School - Olongapo City
Opol Adventist Elementary School - Opol, Misamis Oriental
Ozamis City SDA Elementary School - Ozamis City
Pagadian Adventist Center Elementary School - Pagadian City
Pagulingin Adventist Elementary School - Lipa, Batangas
Palawan Adventist Elementary School - Narra, Palawan
Pantukan Adventist Learning Center - Pantukan, Compostela Valley
Pasay Adventist Elementary School - Pasay
Pinamalayan Adventist Elementary School - Pinamalayan, Oriental Mindoro
Polangui Adventist Elementary School - Polangui, Albay
Puerto Princesa Adventist Elementary School - Puerto Princesa, Palawan
Quezon City Adventist Elementary School - Quezon City
Roxas Adventist Elementary School - Roxas, Mindoro Oriental
San Bartolome Adventist Elementary School - Malvar, Batangas
San Francisco Adventist Elementary School - San Francisco, Quezon
Santiago Adventist Elementary School - Santiago, Agusan del Norte
Sarangani Adventist Academy for the Arts - Alabel, Sarangani Province
SDA Christian Hope Academy - North Poblacion, Maramag, Bukidnon
Sta. Catalina SDA Elementary School - San Luis, Pampanga
Sta. Isabel Adventist Elementary School - San Pablo, Laguna
Sibuguey Valley SDA Elementary School - Bayog, Zamboanga del Sur
Silang Adventist Elementary School - Silang, Cavite
South Bay Adventist School - Botong Oton, Iloilo
Surigao City Adventist Learning Center - Surigao City
Tabugon Adventist Elementary School - Kabankalan, Negros Occidental
Tacloban City Adventist Elementary School - Tacloban City
Talairon Adventist Elementary School - Talairon, Oroquieta City
Talimundoc Adventist Elementary School - Orani, Bataan
Tambulig Adventist Elementary School - Tambulig, Zamboanga del Sur
Tarlac Adventist Elementary School - Tarlac City
Tibanga SDA Elementary School - Iligan City
Tigaon Adventist Elementary School - Tigaon, Camarines Sur
Timonan Adventist Elementary School - Dumingag, Zamboanga del Sur
Town Central Adventist Learning Center - Consolacion, Cebu
Tukuran SDA Elementary School - Tukuran, Zamboanga del Sur
Ubay SDA Elementary School - Ubay, Bohol
Valencia City Adventist Elementary School - Valencia City
WakeBridge Adventist Acdemy-Balasan, Iloilo
Western Mindanao Adventist Academy Elementary School - Dumingag, Zamboanga del Sur
Wonderland Adventist Elementary School- Wao, Lanao del Sur

See also
List of Seventh-day Adventist colleges and universities
List of Seventh-day Adventist hospitals
List of Seventh-day Adventist medical schools

Sources
Adventist Yearbook
Adventist Academy Links 
Adventist Directory Locate Adventist Entities

References

 Philippines
Seventh-day Adventist Church-related lists
Lists of Christian schools